Antioch Township may refer to the following places in the United States:

 Antioch Township, Hot Spring County, Arkansas
 Antioch Township, White County, Arkansas
 Antioch Township, Lake County, Illinois
 Antioch Township, Michigan

Township name disambiguation pages